Şilim is a village in the municipality of Kənarmeşə in the Lankaran Rayon of Azerbaijan.

References

Populated places in Lankaran District